Lucia Giannecchini is an English actress (born 9 June 1980) who played Urszula Rosen in the fifth season of Footballers' Wives. As a child she lived in Cheshire, England and Lucca, Italy and now resides in Central London.

References

External links

Living people
English television actresses
1980 births
Place of birth missing (living people)